The 1905 Primera División was the 5th season of top-flight football in Uruguay. CURCC won its 3rd. league title, after winning all matches played.

Overview
The tournament consisted of a round-robin championship. It involved five teams, and was marked by the death of Nacional symbol footballers, Carlos and Bolivar Céspedes, due to the smallpox epidemic in June of that year. In turn, the lackluster performance of Albion hinted that the end was near for this institution, which did not fit with semi professional practices that began to appear in some institutions.

Teams

League standings

References
Uruguay – List of final tables (RSSSF)

Uruguayan Primera División seasons
1905 in South American football leagues
1